Katy is a British television adaptation of Katy by Jacqueline Wilson. The Wilson novel is a modern retelling of What Katy Did by Susan Coolidge. It first aired on CBBC in March 2018.

Cast 
 Chloe Lea as Katy Carr
 Letty Butler as Izzie
 Simon Trinder as Dad
 Bea Glancy as Elsie
 Imogen Chadwick as Cecy
 Jasmine De Goede as Eva Jenkins
 Rachel Watson as Clover Carr
 Ruth Madeley as Helen
 Jack Carroll as Dexter
 Max True as Ryan
 Liz Hume Dawson as Nurse Jasmine
 Pauline Jefferson as Mrs. Burton

Plot synopsis 
Katy Carr is a tomboyish girl in a blended family, who is having trouble getting along with her stepmother, Izzy. After a bad fall, she learns to adapt to being in a wheelchair, whilst trying to fit in at high school.

Production and reception 
The series was commissioned by CBBC in June 2017. Katy won two Children's BAFTAs: Best Young Performer for Chloe Lea and Best Writer for Tom Bidwell. Katy was also nominated for Best Drama Series

Letty Butler won a Children's BAFTA for her role as Izzy.

References

External links 
 
 

2010s British children's television series
2018 British television series debuts
2018 British television series endings
BBC children's television shows
Television shows about disability
Television series by BBC Studios